Teenage Engineering is a Swedish consumer electronics company and manufacturer founded in 2005 by Jesper Kouthoofd, David Eriksson, Jens Rudberg and David Möllerstedt and based in Stockholm. Its products include electronics and synthesizers, with its core product being the OP-1, as well as instant cameras.

History
Teenage Engineering was founded in 2005 by Jesper Kouthoofd, Jens Rudberg, David Eriksson and later joined by David Möllerstedt, who previously headed the audio department at EA DICE. Their first product, the OP-1, was introduced at the NAMM Show in 2010. Shortly after release, Teenage Engineering produced several "accessories", which could be used to manipulate the unit's input knobs.

Following the success of the OP-1, the company began working with the Stig Carlsson Foundation to develop the OD-11 speaker, inspired by a speaker of the same name manufactured by Sonab and designed by Swedish designer Stig Carlsson in 1974. It was well received for its minimalist design, a faithful reproduction of the original, and for its sound quality. Despite two early appearances at the Consumer Electronics Show and an original release date of Summer 2013, it was not released until 2014. Teenage Engineering aimed to maintain Carlsson's goal of designing a speaker for use in a "regular home", rather than one designed to be used in an unrealistically ideal, noiseless environment.

In 2013, the company collaborated with the Swedish clothing company Cheap Monday after ordering new work uniforms from them; Kouthoofd had previously collaborated with creative director, Ann-Sofie Back. The companies jointly announced the Pocket Operator (PO-10) synthesizer series in January 2015. The series includes three models: PO-12 rhythm, a drum machine; PO-14 sub, a bass synthesizer; and PO-16 factory, a lead synthesizer. Each model doubles as a 16-step sequencer. The series uses a minimalist design, evoking pocket calculators and, according to Kouthoofd, Nintendo's Game & Watch games. Sonically, they emulate vintage synthesizers, in response to the contemporary surge in the popularity of retro style electronic music gear. The synthesizers debuted at the 2015 NAMM Show. The Pocket Operators were a success at NAMM, and sales were estimated by third parties to be as high as 40,000 units, which delayed shipments by up to three months.

The PO-20 series of the Pocket Operators were introduced at the 2016 NAMM show. The PO-20 synthesizers have some additional effects and functionality that were not present in the original PO-10 series, but maintain the  price point. The PO-30 series further elaborates upon the original Pocket operators by adding a drum synthesizer made in collaboration with MicroTonic, a sampler, and a voice synthesizer. These were released starting in late 2017 at a slightly increased price from previous series. PO-30 devices feature a microphone for use in recording audio samples and for transferring data.

In 2018, Teenage Engineering announced a new line of audio equipment products, Frekvens, in collaboration with IKEA. The modular system takes visual cues from Bauhaus design. Founder Kouthoofd had previously collaborated with IKEA on Knäppa, a camera made of cardboard.

On 22 May 2019, Panic announced Playdate, a new handheld video game console designed in collaboration with Teenage Engineering. The device features a mechanical crank which is specifically credited to Teenage Engineering.

On 25 February 2021, Teenage Engineering announced that it will partner with the British-based Tech company, Nothing, to produce the design aesthetic of the brand and their products. Teenage Engineering later worked on the audio for the "ear (1)", Nothing's first product.

Awards and accolades

 The OP-1 synthesizer won one of ten of Sweden's Design S Awards in 2012. The award committee described the OP-1 as "A technological product which through a clever colour scheme and fantastic graphics is intuitive, easily accessible and incredibly inviting. Music and machine in one".
 In 2014, the OP-1 was awarded second prize in Georgia Tech's Margaret Guthman Musical Instrument Competition.
 In 2017, the Pocket Operator series was awarded a Good Design Award by the Japan Institute of Design Promotion. The Institute noted that while the functions of the devices were not immediately clear, the format "inspires a desire to press the buttons".

Musicians
Musicians who use Teenage Engineering products include Bon Iver, Beck, Depeche Mode, Thom Yorke, Jean Michel Jarre, Caroline Rose and Ivan Dorn.

Products
 OP-1 (introduced January 2010)
Oplab (introduced January 2012)
OD-11 (introduced January 2013)
ortho remote (introduced January 2013)
PO-12 rhythm, PO-14 sub & PO-16 factory (introduced January 2015; collaboration with Cheap Monday)
Impossible I-1 (introduced May 2016; designed by teenage engineering for The Impossible Project)
PO-20 arcade, PO-24 office & PO-28 robot (introduced January 2016; collaboration with Cheap Monday)
PO-32 tonic (introduced January 2017)
H (introduced November 2017; designed by teenage engineering for Raven)
R (introduced November 2017; designed by teenage engineering for Raven)
PO-33 KO! & PO-35 speak (introduced January 2018)
Frekvens collection (introduced April 2018; designed by teenage engineering for IKEA)
OP-Z (introduced September 2018)
pocket operator modular series (POM-16, POM-170 & POM-400) (introduced January 2019)
PO-137 Rick and Morty (introduced July 2019; collaboration with Adult Swim (Rick and Morty))
 Playdate (introduced May 2019; designed by teenage engineering for Panic Inc.)
M-1 (introduced December 2019)
OB-4 (introduced September 2020)
PO-128 Mega Man & PO-133 Streetfighter (introduced October 2020; collaboration with Capcom)
ear (1) (introduced July 2021; designed by teenage engineering for Nothing)
Mayku Multiplier (introduced September 2021; designed by teenage engineering for Mayku)
computer-1 (introduced October 2021)
TX-6 (introduced April 2022)
OP-1 Field (introduced May 2022)
PO-80 portable record player and engraver (introduced October 2022; collaboration with Yuri Suzuki)
CH-8 singing wooden dolls (introduced November 2022)

References

External links
 

Manufacturing companies based in Stockholm
Synthesizer manufacturing companies of Sweden
Swedish brands
Musical instrument manufacturing companies of Sweden
Manufacturing companies established in 2005
Swedish companies established in 2005